SAP SE employs 22,000 employees globally. Employees in Germany have been represented by a works council since 2006 and also have employee and trade union representatives in the Supervisory Board. Employees in Israel are unionised with Histadrut.

Germany

Works Council 
On 23 February 2006, three employees at SAP AG in Germany initiated the legal process to form a Works Council. All three of the initiators were members of IG Metall trade union. In a vote held at the "works meeting" on 2 March, 91% of employees opposed the formation of a works council. On 14 March, the SAP Supervisory Board responded by organizing another "works meeting" on 30 March, with a group of employees perceived as less close to the trade unions to administer the Works Council elections, making the court application redundant. Other companies, like IBM already had works councils.

2006 election 
On 21 June 2006, 65% of the 10,800 employees of SAP AG voted amongst 10 different lists fielding over 400 employee candidates. A 37 seats Works Council was established for the first time, with 16 seats going to "Wir für Dich" (We For You), 11 seats to "MUT" and 3 seats each for the lists "Die Unabhängigen" (The Independent), "ABS" and "Pro Betriebsrat" (Pro Works Council) and the remaining 1 seat to "TEAM". The other four lists did not receive enough votes to win any seats. The initial 3 colleagues who started the election process were on the "Pro Betriebsrat" list.

in December, the employer promoted a unified works council election at SAP Germany. At SAP Systems Integration (SI), separate elections were held at all 6 locations in Germany. In 2008, SAP SI merged with SAP Germany, resulting in a single Works Council.

2022 election 
In the Works Council election on 5 May 2022, 15 out of 45 seats, or one-third went to the IG Metall and Ver.di trade union lists. Two trade union representatives chair the Works Council for the first time in SAP history. Eberhard Schick from the IG Metall "Pro Mitbeistimmung" (Pro co-determination) list was elected as the chair, and Anne Schmitz of the Ver.di "Upgrade" list as the deputy chair.

Supervisory Board 
In 1989, one year after SAP went public, it organised Supervisory Board elections as required under the German Codetermination Act. The two elected employee representatives on the board were Gerhard Maier and Bernhard Koller. In the 1993 elections, the union seats went to the Christian Metalworkers' Union. 

Prior to 2014, SAP Group was legally structured as a German Aktiengesellschaft, with a 16 seat Supervisory Board. In accordance with the Codetermination Act, half of the seats are reserved for the employer, with the remaining eight seats for employees, including two trade union representatives who are typically not employees of SAP. 

In 2014 the SAP AG was converted into SAP SE, a European Company (Societas Europaea; SE). Employee representation on the company Supervisory Board is required under the EU Employee Involvement Directive 2001 (SE-Beteiligungsgesetz; SEBG). Currently, SAP SE (across Europe) has 18 seats, with half reserved for employees.

Court rulings 
The German Federal Labour Court referred a question to the European Court of Justice (C-677/20), whether German legislation on trade union representation in Supervisory Boards is compatible with Article 4 of the Employee Involvement Directive, specifically whether distinct elections for trade union appointments must be maintained. The Court Advocate-General agreed that national laws with regards to trade union representatives and electoral procedures remained applicable even after the conversion into a European company.

A provision in the Agreement between SAP and the Special Negotiation Body of the SE Works Council which has not been activated yet, would allow for SAP to reduce the Supervisory Board to 12 seats, of which six are reserved for employees, four in Germany specifically. While trade unions Ver.di and IG Metall would able to nominate representatives, they would no longer be able to hold separate elections as previously done in an Aktiengesellschaft form.

Israel 
The Israeli branch of SAP is unionised under the Cellular, Internet and High-Tech Workers Union of the Histadrut trade union federation. A collective agreement signed in 2020 between SAP and Histadrut covers 800 workers in Israel.

See also 
 Volkswagen worker organisations
 Google worker organizations
 IBM worker organizations
 Unionization in the tech sector

Notes

References

External 
 Verdi SAP portal (in German)
 IG Metall SAP portal (in German)

Employee
Tech sector trade unions
SAP
Labor relations in Germany